A corniculary or cornicular was an officer of the Roman legions who served as the adjutant to a centurion, so named for wearing a cornicule (corniculum), a small, horn-shaped badge.

See also
List of Roman army unit types

Military ranks of ancient Rome
Ancient Roman titles